William Fishman may refer to:
 William J. Fishman (1921–2014), British historian and academic
 William H. Fishman (1914–2001), Canadian-American cancer researcher
 Bill Fishman (director), American film director